The 2016 New Zealand Sevens was the third tournament within the 2015–16 World Rugby Sevens Series and the seventeenth edition of the Wellington Sevens. It was held over the weekend 30–31 January 2016 at Westpac Stadium in Wellington, New Zealand.

Format
The teams were drawn into four pools of four teams each. Each team plays every other team in their pool once. The top two teams from each pool advanced to the Cup/Plate brackets. The bottom two teams from each group went to the Bowl/Shield brackets.

Teams
The 16 participating teams for the tournament:

Squads
Final squads were announced on 28 January 2016. The most notable announced addition was the debut of 2015 Rugby World Cup winner Sonny Bill Williams for New Zealand.

Pool Stage

Pool A

Pool B

Pool C

Pool D

Knockout stage

Shield

Bowl

Plate

Cup

Cup final 

The Cup final of the 2016 Wellington Sevens was contested by New Zealand and South Africa, after they won their semi-final matches against England and Fiji respectively. It was the second time the two teams met in the tournament, after New Zealand won their Pool A match 19–14 the previous day.

New Zealand's Sonny Bill Williams dropped the ball from the kick-off, immediately giving possession straight back to South Africa. They led 7–0 with a converted try to Philip Snyman after three minutes, which was soon increased to 14–0 after Rosko Specman scored from a five meter scrum. Cheslin Kolbe converted both tries. Akira Ioane scored a try for New Zealand 30 seconds before half-time, which Kurt Baker converted, making the scoreline 14-7 at the break.

Specman almost scored a second try before a wayward Williams pass allowed Seabelo Senatla to extend South Africa's lead to 21-7 halfway through the second half. With less than four minutes remaining, Specman was sent to the sin bin following a professional foul, with South Africa reduced to six men. Rieko Ioane scored two tries with Baker converted one, reducing South Africa's lead to 21–19. Despite Specman returning to the field and the full-time hooter sounding, New Zealand completed their come-from-behind victory, with Joe Webber scoring a try in injury time to secure a 24–21 victory for the hosts, ensuring New Zealand won their home tournament for the third year in succession.

Australian referee Matt O'Brien officiated the final, but received criticism for his handling of the match, with a number of decisions in the latter stages of the match being given in New Zealand's favour and South Africa's coach Neil Powell later said that he would seek clarification from the officials. Some New Zealand observers have commented that the officiating was an embarrassment.

Despite the loss, South Africa moved to the top of the 2015–16 World Rugby Sevens Series log, two points ahead of second-placed Fiji.

References

External links
World Rugby Sevens Series website

2016
Wellington Sevens
2016 in New Zealand sport